Filippo de Angelis (16 April 1792 – 8 July 1877) was an Italian cardinal of the Roman Catholic Church who served as both archbishop of Fermo from 1842 and camerlengo from 1867 until his death. Angelis was elevated to the cardinalate in 1839.

Life
Filippio de Angelis was born in Ascoli Piceno to a patrician family. He studied at the seminary in Ascoli Piceno before entering the Pontifical Academy of Ecclesiastical Nobles in Rome in 1816. He then attended La Sapienza University, from where he obtained his doctorates in canon and civil law (22 July 1818), philosophy, and theology (25 September 1819).

After his ordination to the priesthood, Angelis was raised to the rank of Domestic Prelate and served as a professor at his alma mater of the Pontifical Academy of Ecclesiastical Nobles for many years. He was made a canon of the Liberian Basilica as well.

On 6 July 1826, Angelis was appointed Coadjutor Bishop of Montefiascone and Titular Bishop of Leuce by Pope Leo XII. Then he was Apostolic Visitor in Forlì.

He received his episcopal consecration on the following 23 July from Cardinal Pietro Francesco Galleffi, with Archbishops Giuseppe della Porta Rodiani and Giovanni Sinibaldi serving as co-consecrators, in the church of Ss. Trinita a Montecitorio. In 1830 Angelis was promoted to Titular Archbishop of Cartagine on 15 March and later named Nuncio to Switzerland on 23 April. He was named Nuncio to Portugal on 13 November 1832, but remained in Switzerland until April 1839 and never occupied the post in Portugal because its diplomatic relations with the Holy See were terminated shortly after his appointment.

Angelis was appointed Bishop of Montefiascone, with the personal title of "Archbishop," on 15 February 1838. Pope Gregory XVI secretly (in pectore) elevated him to the College of Cardinals in the consistory of the following 13 September, eventually publishing him as Cardinal Priest of S. Bernardo alle Terme. He was made Archbishop of Fermo on 27 January 1842 and later participated in the papal conclave of 1846, which selected Pope Pius IX.

On 20 September 1867, Angelis was named Chamberlain of the Holy Roman Church, or Camerlengo. He opted for the titular church of San Lorenzo in Lucina on that same date as well. Becoming Cardinal Protopriest (the longest-serving member of the order of Cardinal Priests) on the following 4 December, Angelis attended the First Vatican Council (1868-1870), of which he was made chief presiding officer on 30 December 1869.

He died in Fermo at the age of 85. At the time of his death, he was the oldest living cardinal. He is buried in Fermo.

Notes

Bibliography

External links
Cardinals of the Holy Roman Church
Catholic-Hierarchy 

|-

1792 births
1877 deaths
People from Ascoli Piceno
19th-century Italian cardinals
Archbishops of Fermo
Cardinals created by Pope Gregory XVI
19th-century Italian Roman Catholic archbishops
Bishops of Montefiascone
Apostolic Nuncios to Switzerland
Camerlengos of the Holy Roman Church